The Association of Local Colleges and Universities or simply ALCU is composed of forty (40) local colleges and universities of the Philippines. ALCU is working closely with the Senate Committee on Education, which is headed by Senator Alan Peter Cayetano, in legislations that benefit existing local colleges and universities.

The primary thrust of ALCU is to improve the quality of instruction, research, and extension of its member schools and to provide value public tertiary education.

The association has created in the later part of 2003 the Commission on Accreditation, Inc., which is working closely with the Accrediting Agency of Chartered Colleges and Universities in the Philippines, Inc. (AACCUP).

During the investiture of Atty. Adel A. Tamano at the Justo Albert Auditorium of the PLM, he mentioned his plan of drafting the best-practices manual for local colleges and make it a project of the ALCU.

Accreditation and standards
Together with the Accrediting Agencies of Chartered Colleges and Universities of the Philippines (AACCUP), the ALCUCOA formed the National Network of Quality Assurance Agencies (NNQAA) in 2004 to ensure the public of quality higher education among public higher educational institutions. With the help of AACCUP, Dr. Nida Africa, and the PAASCU executive director, ALCU member schools immerse themselves in quality assurance activities involving the following areas of accreditation. These include:
 Employability
 Community service
 Curriculum and instruction
 Research
 Faculty
 Student services
 Administration
 Physical plant and facilities
 Library
 Laboratory

Many ALCU member schools are now aiming for accreditation to uplift the quality of their program offerings.

To uphold quality higher education, ALCU partnered with the Commission on Higher Education as part of the Technical Working Group that three ordinances namely CMO No. 32, series of 2006, and CMO Nos. 1 and 10, series 2005.

Member-Schools
The following is a list of local colleges and universities or LCUs that are members of the association. These include:

References

College and university associations and consortia in the Philippines
Educational organizations based in the Philippines
Organizations based in Manila
Local colleges and universities in the Philippines